Hazeldean Road (Ottawa Road #36) is a major road in Ottawa's west end. This road runs between the junction of Highway 7 west of Stittsville and  Eagleson Road in Kanata, where it becomes Robertson Road east of the intersection and proceeds towards Bells Corners in the former city of Nepean, Ontario as a four-lane rural route through the  Greenbelt. 

It was once part of Highway 7 and Highway 15 before the western leg of Highway 417 was completed.

Most of the Kanata section of the road is commercial, and includes Hazeldean Mall, (although it actually faces Eagleson Road) a key shopping centre in the Kanata area. It is a four-lane road, with a  speed limit between Terry Fox Drive and Eagleson Road. West of Kanata towards Highway 7, it is mostly a two-lane rural route, although work was completed in Spring 2012 to widen the road to four lanes due to the increasing amount of traffic coming from Stittsville's growing community. The speed limit west of Terry Fox Drive was  prior to road widening.

The widening of Hazeldean Road was completed in early 2012 between West Ridge Drive and Terry Fox Drive in Kanata, and includes a unique suspension bridge over the Carp River. Several strip malls and big-box stores have recently opened along Hazeldean Road, including Lowe's, Winners, Shoppers Drug Mart, and Food Basics. Restaurants such as Five Guys, Subway, Mr. Shawarma, and several others have also recently opened or are under construction in the area.

A new water main was installed between Terry Fox Drive and Castlefrank Road. The installation must be completed before construction can resume in the new subdivision of Kanata West, located near Huntmar Drive north of Hazeldean Road. A portion of the construction, between Terry Fox Drive and Young Road, was completed during the summer/fall of 2012, with the remainder completed in fall 2013.

Communities

 Jackson Trails
 Fernbank (future)
 Westridge
 Kanata West (currently under construction)
 Katimavik
 Glen Cairn

Major Intersections

 Eagleson Road
 Irwin Gate & Carbrooke Street
 Castlefrank Road
 Terry Fox Drive
 Grant Crossing Centre
 Huntmar Drive & Iber Road
 Fringewood Drive
 Johnwoods Street & Victor Street
 Springbrook Drive
 Stittsville Main Street
 Carp Road
 West Ridge Drive & Kittiwake Drive
 Rothbourne Road
 Highway 7
 David Manchester Road & Speedway Road
 Spruce Ridge Road

External links

Hazeldean Road Project

Roads in Ottawa